The Finnish Ski Association is a skiing governing body in Finland, based in Helsinki and Lahti. It is a member of FIS, and runs cross-country skiing, ski jumping, Nordic skiing, and alpine skiing.

It was established in 1908 as Liitto Suomen hiihtourheilun edistämiseksi. The first chairman was Lennart Munck Af Flukila. Its modern name was adopted in 1931.

Chairmen 
 1908–1911 Lennart Munck Af Flukila
 1911–1912 Artur Antman
 1912–1913 Eino Saastamoinen
 1914–1915 Frans Ilander
 1915–1931 Toivo Aro
 1931 Armas Palmros
 1931–1937 Juho Hillo
 1937–1941 Tauno Aarre
 1941–1942 Kalle Vierto
 1942 Armas Palamaa
 1942–1954 Yrjö Kaloniemi
 1954–1960 Akseli Kaskela
 1960–1967 Ali Koskimaa
 1967–1985 Hannu Koskivuori
 1986–1989 Matti Autio
 1990–1995 Eino Petäjäniemi
 1996–2000 Esko Aho
 2000–2002 Paavo M. Petäjä
 2003–2004 Seppo Rehunen
 2005–2009 Jaakko Holkeri
 2009–2013 Matti Sundberg
 2013-2017 Jukka-Pekka Vuori
 2017–     Markku Haapasalmi

References

External links
National members of the International Ski Federation 

National members of the International Ski Federation
1908 establishments in Finland
Sports organizations established in 1908
Skiing in Finland
Skiing organizations
Ski